Saber Hussein (born 20 February 1974) is an Egyptian handball player. He competed at the 1996 Summer Olympics, the 2000 Summer Olympics and the 2004 Summer Olympics.

References

External links
 

1974 births
Living people
Egyptian male handball players
Olympic handball players of Egypt
Handball players at the 1996 Summer Olympics
Handball players at the 2000 Summer Olympics
Handball players at the 2004 Summer Olympics
Place of birth missing (living people)
21st-century Egyptian people